The Juno Award for Rap Recording of the Year was introduced in 1991, and awarded for the best rap album in Canada. It was formerly known as Best Rap Recording from 1993 to 2002.

Before 1999, because of the relatively limited commercial visibility of Canadian hip hop, the award was presented the evening before the main Juno Award ceremony, along with the untelevised technical and industry insider awards. In 1998, Rascalz won the award, but claiming racism as a factor in the award's scheduling, refused to accept it. The Junos moved the award to the main ceremony the following year.

The award nominations commonly mixed individual singles and full albums. At the Juno Awards of 2021, CARAS president Allan Reid announced that beginning with the Juno Awards of 2022, the category will be split into new separate categories for Rap Album/EP of the Year and Rap Single of the Year.

Winners

Rap Recording of the Year (1991 - 1992)

Best Rap Recording (1993 - 2002)

Rap Recording of the Year (2003 - present)

See also

Canadian hip hop
Music of Canada

References

External links
Juno Awards archive of past winners

Rap Recording
Canadian hip hop